Hedong is a town of Guazhou County in northwestern Gansu province, China, located  due east of the county seat and  northwest of Jiuquan as the crow flies. , it has four villages under its administration.

References 

Township-level divisions of Gansu
Guazhou County